6β-Naltrexol-d4, also known as 6β-hydroxynaltrexone-d4, is a deuterium-labeled form of 6β-naltrexol used for NMR imaging. Unlike opioid inverse agonists such as naloxone and naltrexone (which are often dubbed "antagonists" for simplicity's sake), 6β-naltrexol and 6β-naltrexol-d4 are opioid neutral antagonists.

References

4,5-Epoxymorphinans
Kappa-opioid receptor antagonists
Mu-opioid receptor antagonists
Semisynthetic opioids